The 1998 WNBA season was the 2nd for the Cleveland Rockers. The Rockers topped the Eastern Conference, but they were unable to reach the WNBA Finals, losing in the WNBA semifinals to the Phoenix Mercury.

Offseason

WNBA Draft

Regular season

Season standings

Season schedule

Playoffs

Player stats

Awards and honors
Suzie McConnell Serio, WNBA Newcomer of the Year Award
Isabelle Fijalkowski, WNBA Peak Performer
Suzie McConnell Serio, WNBA Sportsmanship Award

References

External links
Rockers on Basketball Reference

Cleveland Rockers seasons
Cleveland
Eastern Conference (WNBA) championship seasons
Cleveland Rockers